The 1983 Houston Oilers season was the 24th season overall and 14th with the National Football League (NFL). The team improved upon their previous season's output of 1–8, winning two games, but failed to qualify for the playoffs for the third consecutive season. The 460 points allowed by the team are the most given up by the team in franchise history.

The week 13 game against Tampa Bay, in which both teams had 1–11 records, was nicknamed the "Repus Bowl". Steve Wulf wrote of the game, "Yes, this was the Small One, the battle of the beatens, the movable object meeting the resistible force. There were only tomorrows. When these two teams get together, nothing can happen. This game was for a marble." Tampa Bay won the game 33-24.

The last remaining active member of the 1983 Houston Oilers was offensive lineman Bruce Matthews, who retired after the 2001 season.

Offseason

NFL draft

Personnel

Staff

Roster

Schedule

Season summary

Week 1 vs Packers

Week 11 vs Lions

Standings

References

Houston Oilers seasons
Houston Oilers
Houston